Ami Aadu, formerly titled Aadur Prem, is a 2011 Bengali film produced by New Theatres and directed by Somnath Gupta. In this film the protagonist, Aadu, a poor Bengali village girl from Murshidabad, writes a letter to U.S. President George W. Bush informing him about the hardships in her life caused by the 2003 invasion of Iraq.

This was Gupta's debut film as a director. Actress Deblina Chatterjee, who played the title role, made her cinematic acting debut with this film as well. The film received National Film Award for Best Feature Film in Bengali in 2010.

Plot
It is the early 2000s; George W. Bush is the President of the United States and Saddam Hussein is the President of Iraq. Meanwhile, Aadu, a young poor Hindu girl living in a village in Murshidabad, India, falls in love with Suleman, a Muslim garment supplier who lives in the nearby village of Amodiya. Suleman dreams of learning English and becoming a fluent speaker, so he can go overseas and find a job. Though Aadu and Suelman follow different religions, their families allow them to marry, and the marriage goes off smoothly.

The impoverished Suleman decides to head to Iraq with his friend Jabbar in search of a good job, leaving his new wife Aadu in the village. Then, in March 2003, the United States invades Iraq. Because of the war and the resulting political turmoil, all communication links between Aadu's village and Iraq are cut off. Aadu and the villagers gradually learn news about the bombings and destruction in Iraq and are horrified. The helpless Aadu decides to write a letter to U.S. President George W. Bush, whom she heard was "all powerful", informing him about the troubles in her life caused by the Iraq War.

Cast 
 Deblina Chatterjee as Aadu
 Samadarshi Dutta as Suleman
 Bidipta Chakraborty
 Rudranil Ghosh as Jabbar
 Ena Saha as Amina
 Mithu Chakraborty
 Pradip Mukherjee 
 Biplab Chatterjee as Mainuddin
 Angana Basu
 Soumitra Chatterjee
 Pradip Mukherjee

Release and reception 

The film released on 25 February 2011 and got positive reviews from critics. The Indian Express gave it four stars and in The Times of India critic's rating the film got three and a half starts out of five stars. Acting of both Deblina Chatterjee as Aadu and Samdardhi Dutta as Suleman were critically appreciated. The Indian Express wrote in their review, Debalina Chatterjee's as Aadu was "mind-blowing" in the film. Soumik Halder's cinematography, specially the shots of rural Bengal and editing of Arghyakamal Mitra were appreciated too.

See also 

 My Name Is Khan, a 2010 Indian film with similar undertones

References

External links 
 

2011 films
Bengali-language Indian films
2010s Bengali-language films
Films set in 2003
Indian interfaith romance films
Iraq War in fiction
Best Bengali Feature Film National Film Award winners
2011 directorial debut films